The North Cape Light is an active lighthouse on Prince Edward Island, Canada. It was built in 1867, and is still active.

See also
 List of lighthouses in Prince Edward Island
 List of lighthouses in Canada

References

External links

 Aids to Navigation Canadian Coast Guard

Lighthouses completed in 1867
Lighthouses in Prince Edward Island
Heritage sites in Prince Edward Island
1867 establishments in the British Empire
Lighthouses on the Canadian Register of Historic Places